A Tiparillo is a shorter, thinner, and milder cigar with a plastic tip. It is manufactured by the General Cigar Company. The name Tiparillo, a portmanteau of tip and cigarillo, was trademarked on July 3, 1961 by the Pinkerton Tobacco Company of Owensboro, Kentucky.

Postwar cigar makers had begun seeking to transform the image of their product to attract young smokers and women  who preferred cigarettes.

Heavily advertised in the media, the most famous campaigns and taglines were "Should a gentleman offer a lady a Tiparillo?" and a cigarette girl offering "Cigars, Cigarettes, Tiparillos".

Notes

Cigar brands
Products introduced in 1961